Yura District is one of twenty-nine districts of the Arequipa Province in Peru.

Geography
Other mountains are listed below:

References

Districts of the Arequipa Province
Districts of the Arequipa Region